Shane Lewis Cansdell-Sherriff (born 10 November 1982), also known simply as Shane Sherriff, is an Australian professional footballer. Traditionally a left or central defender, Sherriff has also been deployed on the left side of midfield. He is currently coaching at Australian football club Bankstown City.

Club career
Sherriff's first professional club was Leeds United, who spotted him playing for the New South Wales academy team.  He spent three years at the club, but only tasted first team football on loan at Rochdale in 2002.  Sherriff was released by Leeds during the club's financial crisis in 2003, and signed for Danish Superliga side AGF Aarhus.  After three years in Denmark, Sherriff was signed by Tranmere Rovers at the start of the 2006–07 season after impressing manager Ronnie Moore on trial and was made club captain, making over 40 appearances in his debut season.  During the 2007–08 season, injuries to the club's first choice wingers Steve Davies and Chris Shuker and the arrival of Andy Taylor at left back saw Sherriff frequently appearing on the left side of midfield.

On 28 June 2008 he signed for Football League Two team Shrewsbury Town on a two-year contract. He scored a goal on his debut, a 40-yard thunderbolt, in the 4–0 win over Macclesfield Town on 9 August 2008. He established himself as a first team regular at the club, and in June 2010, he signed a new two-year contract with the club.

Cansdell-Sherriff played over 120 games for Shrewsbury and captained the side along with becoming the club's longest serving player at the time when he was playing with the team. On 16 March 2011, Cansdell-Sherriff was called to join the Australian national squad for a training camp, however ultimately he did not earn a cap for the national team.

After suffering a shoulder injury during a 2–1 home win to Southend in January 2012, Cansdell-Sherriff indicated his desire to earn a further contract extension at Shrewsbury Town On 16 May 2012, Cansdell-Sherriff joined Football League One side Preston North End after rejecting a new contract at Shrewsbury.
On 25 September 2013, Cansdell-Sherriff joined League Two side Burton Albion on a three-month loan deal. He then signed a two-year with Burton Albion after his contract with Preston North End expired in May 2014. He was released by Burton Albion at the end of the 2015–16 season.

On 13 July 2016, Cansdell-Sheriff signed for Manly United FC in National Premier Leagues NSW. He stated his ambition of easing into the coaching profession as the main reason of his joining, saying, "I will be working on my coaching experience where I can. I would like to go into management once I finish playing so while I continue to play I will continue to learn as a player and how various coaching ideas effect players."

In 2020, after taking a year off in 2019, Sherriff returned to playing for Adamstown Rosebud. Cansdell-Sheriff departed the club in December 2020.

Coaching career
On 25 July 2017, was appointed Head Coach of Australian side Adamstown Rosebuds. Cansdell-Sherriff left the club in December 2020.

In March 2021, Cansdell-Sheriff was appointed as the head coach for Bankstown City FC

Career statistics

Honours
With Australia:
 FIFA U-17 World Championship: 1999 (Runners-Up)

References

External links

Official Danish League stats
Tranmere Rovers profile
OzFootball profile

1982 births
Living people
Soccer players from Sydney
Leeds United F.C. players
Rochdale A.F.C. players
Aarhus Gymnastikforening players
Tranmere Rovers F.C. players
Shrewsbury Town F.C. players
Preston North End F.C. players
Australian expatriate soccer players
Footballers at the 2004 Summer Olympics
Olympic soccer players of Australia
Australian expatriate sportspeople in England
Expatriate footballers in England
Expatriate men's footballers in Denmark
English Football League players
Danish Superliga players
New South Wales Institute of Sport alumni
Association football defenders
Australian soccer players